Peter Johannes Rutten (9 December 1864, Afferden (Limburg) – 3 September 1953, Wanssum) was a Dutch politician.

References
P.J. Rutten at www.parlement.com

1864 births
1953 deaths
Members of the House of Representatives (Netherlands)
People from Bergen, Limburg